The Illinois River Bridge, also known as the Midway Bridge, is a historic concrete arch bridge near Siloam Springs, Arkansas. Built in 1922 by the Luten Bridge Company of Knoxville, Tennessee, it is one of a modest number of bridges of this once-popular and common type remaining in the state.

The bridge was listed on the National Register of Historic Places in 1988.  It has also been documented in a Historic American Engineering Record report.

See also
Illinois River Bridge (Pedro, Arkansas)
List of bridges documented by the Historic American Engineering Record in Arkansas
List of bridges on the National Register of Historic Places in Arkansas
National Register of Historic Places listings in Benton County, Arkansas

References

External links

Road bridges on the National Register of Historic Places in Arkansas
Bridges completed in 1922
Buildings and structures in Siloam Springs, Arkansas
Transportation in Benton County, Arkansas
Historic American Engineering Record in Arkansas
National Register of Historic Places in Benton County, Arkansas
Concrete bridges in the United States
Arch bridges in the United States
Illinois River (Oklahoma)